The 2016 Sepang GP2 Series round was a GP2 Series motor race held on 1 and 2 October 2016 at the Sepang International Circuit in Malaysia. It was the tenth round of the 2016 GP2 Series. The race weekend supported the 2016 Malaysian Grand Prix.

Background
Johnny Cecotto Jr. made his return to GP2 for this round with the Rapax team, whilst Jimmy Eriksson pulled out of the round due to financial setbacks.

Report

Qualifying
Pierre Gasly took another pole with teammate Antonio Giovinazzi in second making it another Prema Racing one-two for qualifying.

Feature Race

Sprint Race

Standings after the round

Drivers' Championship standings

Teams' Championship standings

 Note: Only the top five positions are included for both sets of standings.

See also 
 2016 Malaysian Grand Prix
 2016 Sepang GP3 Series round

References

External links 
 Official website of GP2 Series

GP2
October 2016 sports events in Asia
2016 GP2 Series rounds